Robert C. Dobkin (born 1943 in Philadelphia) is an American electrical engineer, co-founder of Linear Technology Corporation, and veteran linear (analog) integrated circuit (IC) designer.

Career 
Dobkin studied Electrical Engineering at MIT, but did not complete a degree. After early employments e.g. at GE Reentry Systems, he joined Philbrick Nexus in Massachusetts working on IC development with Bob Pease. He joined National Semiconductor (NSC) in January 1969. He resigned the position as Director of Advanced Circuit Development at NSC in July 1981 and co-founded Linear Technology with Robert H. Swanson in the same year.

Dobkin continued to serve as the company's Chief Technical Officer through its acquisition by Analog Devices in 2016. He has been a Director of Spectra7 Microsystems Inc. since March 20, 2013.

Dobkin holds more than 100 patents in the field of analog circuits.

Works
 LM118, first high speed operational amplifier.
 LM199, heated buried-Zener voltage reference, and its improved successor, the LTZ1000.
 LM317, first variable three-pin voltage regulator.
 LT1083, first low-dropout regulator.
 LT3080, three terminal adjustable regulator with a current source reference.

References

External links
Interview with Bob Dobkin, October 27, 2012

1943 births
Living people
American electrical engineers
20th-century American inventors
21st-century American inventors
Analog electronics engineers
Silicon Valley people
Businesspeople from Philadelphia
Engineers from Pennsylvania